FFHG Division 2 (Fédération Française de Hockey sur Glace Division 2 or French Ice Hockey Federation Division 2) is an amateur ice hockey league in France. It is the third of four levels of national ice hockey in France. The teams that end at the bottom of the table get relegated to FFHG Division 3 while the top get promoted to FFHG Division 1.

Teams 
FFHG Division 2 consists of 18 teams divided into two pools with nine teams each.

Pool A 
 Galaxiens d'Amnéville
 Asnières Castors
 Jokers de Cergy
 Elephants de Chambéry
 Jets d’Évry Viry Centre Essonne
 Taureaux de Feu de Limoges
 Spartiates de Marseille
 Ours de Villard-de-Lans
 Lions de Wasquehal

Pool B 
 Chevaliers du Lac d'Annecy
 Castors d'Avignon
 Sangliers Arvernes de Clermont
 Français Volants de Paris
 Comètes de Meudon
 Renards de Roanne
 Dragons de Rouen II
 Étoile Noire de Strasbourg II
 Lynx de Valence

Season 
Each team plays the other teams in their pool at home and away (18 games). At the end of this regular season the 8 highest-ranking teams in each pool enter a combined knock-out play-off series while the four lowest-ranking teams (two from each pool) enter a play-off series of their own. The winner of the former play-off series is promoted to FFHG Division 1 while the loser of the latter play-off series is demoted to FFHG Division 3.

Champions

External links 
 FFHG Division 2 Official Site
 Dunkerque Corsaires Official Website

3
Third tier ice hockey leagues in Europe